Argençola is a municipality in the comarca of the Anoia in Catalonia, Spain. It is situated in the east of the comarca, bordering the Segarra and the Conca de Barberà.  The Anoia river has its source on the territory of the municipality. A local road links the municipality with the main N-II road from Barcelona to Lleida.

Demography

Subdivisions 
The municipality of Argençola includes six outlying villages. Populations are given as of 2001:
Carbasi (30), to the north-east of Argençola at an elevation of 775 m
Clariana (36), to the east of Argençola, with ruins of Clariana castle
Contrast (18), to the south-east of Argençola
Els Plans de Ferran (7)
Porquerisses i Aberells (41), to the north of Argençola
Rocamora (8), to the west of Argençola

References

 Panareda Clopés, Josep Maria; Rios Calvet, Jaume; Rabella Vives, Josep Maria (1989). Guia de Catalunya, Barcelona: Caixa de Catalunya.  (Spanish).  (Catalan).

External links 
 Official website
 Government data pages 

Municipalities in Anoia
Populated places in Anoia